is a Japanese singer, actor, and member of Hey! Say! JUMP. He is under the management of Johnny & Associates. He was born in Saitama Prefecture.
 
On September 23, 2001, he entered Johnny & Associates as a trainee. He later became a member of the Johnny's Jr. group J.J. Express. In 2007, he debuted as a member of Hey! Say! JUMP. He graduated from Meiji University with a degree in architecture in 2013. He plays the keyboard during the group's live shows.

Career
He joined Johnny & Associates as a Johnny's Jr. He appeared regularly on the show, Ya-Ya-yah, as well as J&A show, Shounen Club. He later became a part of the Johnny's Jr. group, J.J. Express with Yuya Takaki, Daiki Arioka, and Yuto Nakajima. He debuted on September 24, 2007, as a member of Hey! Say! JUMP.
 
Since then, Inoo has been cast in numerous dramas and became a frequent guest on Tensai! Shimura Dobutsuen and a regular on Mezamashi TV. He also appeared on the Saturday afternoon variety show, Meringue no Kimochi.
 
He was cast as the main role in the live-action movie adaptation of the manga Peach Girl as Okayasu Kairi which was released in 2017 and marked his film debut.

Personal life 
He has a second-class small boat pilot license and a scuba diving license. Inoo graduated from the Department of Architecture, Faculty of Science and Engineering, Meiji University in 2013.

Inoo is distantly related to Jesse of SixTONES, who is also under Johnny & Associates.

Filmography

Dramas

Movie

Appearances

Awards

References

External links
 Hey! Say! JUMP
 Johnny's-net
 

 

Living people
Japanese male pop singers
Japanese male actors
Japanese male idols
Johnny & Associates
Hey! Say! JUMP members
Musicians from Saitama Prefecture
Actors from Saitama Prefecture
Meiji University alumni
21st-century Japanese singers
21st-century Japanese male singers
Year of birth missing (living people)